Minutemen is a 2008 science-fiction Disney Channel Original Movie. The movie was the most viewed program on American cable TV for the week ending January 27, 2008, with 6.48 million viewers.

The film was written by John Killoran (writing the teleplay) and David Diamond and David Weissman (writing the story) and directed by Lev L. Spiro, who received a Directors Guild nomination for Outstanding Achievement in Children's Programs for it. Andrew Gunn, Ann Marie Sanderlin and Doug Sloan are the executive producers. The movie was originally slated for release in March 2008, but the film premiered on Disney Channel in United States on January 25.

Plot
On the first day of high school, best friends Virgil (Jason Dolley), Derek (Steven R. McQueen), and Stephanie (Chelsea Kane) each decide to try out various activities around the school. However, while Derek tries football and Stephanie tries cheerleading, Virgil's high school career takes a turn when young genius Charlie Tuttle (Luke Benward) interrupts football practice as he tears across the field on a rocket car. As the football team begins harassing Charlie, Virgil comes to his defense only to get bullied as well. Virgil and Charlie are forced to dress like cheerleaders and are hung from the school mascot's statue by their underwear.

Three years later, Virgil and Charlie are outcasts because of the incident despite Derek claiming that he had tried to stop the bullies from humiliating them. Charlie informs Virgil that he has invented a time machine. After enlisting grease junky Zeke (Nicholas Braun) for his mechanical skills, the time machine is built, and they test it out by attempting to purchase a winning lottery ticket in the past. Forgetting that they are underage, they ask a local street performer to buy it for them but are forced to return to the present early. This, in turn, causes the street performer to win the lottery using the numbers they provided. After this failure, Charlie comes up with a plan to only use the machine to undo embarrassing mistakes made by their classmates. The group asks classmate Jeanette (Kara Crane), who has a one-sided crush on Charlie, to oversee the time machine whenever they travel to the past, and she provides them with white snowsuits to protect them from the portal's freezing temperatures.

The trio soon become known as the "Snowsuit Guys" (though they themselves prefer to be called the "Minutemen") and are named local heroes by the students, but labeled as troublemakers by the vice principal (J.P. Manoux) because of them accidentally breaking his diorama of the school. Virgil, Zeke, and Charlie soon realize that the behavior of the teenagers they saved have changed, as the formerly bullied have become bullies themselves. Charlie reveals that in order to get the time machine to work, he had to hack and steal files from NASA. To avoid attracting unwanted attention, Charlie warns Zeke and Virgil to refrain from using the time machine for a while. Virgil later sees Stephanie with a broken leg due to a cheerleading injury that caused her to lose her scholarship to her dream college. Despite Charlie's protests, Virgil convinces the group to travel back in time and prevent Stephanie from getting injured, revealing his identity to her in the process.

After Derek experiences a humiliating loss at the state championship, Stephanie asks Virgil to change the past so Derek can win; in turn, the former friends are reunited. After hanging with the popular kids, Virgil begins to abandon Charlie and Zeke in favor of Stephanie and Derek. However, Stephanie eventually learns that Derek is cheating on her with his tutor Jocelyn. Derek pleads with Virgil to change the past so Stephanie never finds out, but Virgil is reluctant, having realized he has his own feelings for her.

The FBI comes to town after monitoring suspicious activity and interrogates Charlie, Zeke, and Virgil. The trio bitterly disbands due to Virgil's repeated use of the time machine to help his own popularity. After consulting with the government's top scientists, Charlie learns that their trips to the past have damaged the space-time continuum, thus creating a black hole. With only hours to live, the trio reunites and is forced to venture into the hole and close it.

Once they have entered the black hole, they are transported back to their first day of high school, as the key component from the time machine was in Charlie's rocket cart. Virgil realizes that he can undo the events that caused him to lose his popularity. Charlie admits that although Virgil hates this day, it's his favorite as it's the day he finally got a real friend. Charlie and Zeke leave Virgil to make a decision, but as Virgil watches the incident unfold, he discovers that Derek didn’t defend him at all. Instead, he had betrayed him in favor of gaining popularity by suggesting to also put lipstick on the two. Having come to his senses, Virgil picks up the rocket car and reunites with Charlie and Zeke.

The trio race back to the black hole just as it closes. They are then thrown back in time to the day they first time traveled. As they walk through the school, nobody suspects a thing and have no clue of the group’s heroic actions. Virgil stands up to Derek for his treachery and wins Stephanie's heart, while Charlie reciprocates Jeanette's feelings for him. Charlie comes up with a new scientific idea involving teleportation and Virgil and Zeke drag him away as he rambles about his plan.

Cast
 Jason Dolley as Virgil Fox, a social outcast after an embarrassing event
 Luke Benward as Charlie Tuttle, a young genius and outcast who is Virgil and Zeke's best friend
 Nicholas Braun as Zeke Thompson, a "bad boy" outcast who is Charlie and Virgil's best friend
 Chelsea Staub as Stephanie Jameson, Virgil's only former friend who still likes him. Virgil has a crush on her
 J. P. Manoux as Vice Principal Tolkan
 Steven R. McQueen as Derek Beaugard, Virgil's former best friend who is now dating Stephanie. He chose popularity over Virgil, but once he finds out about Virgil's time-travelling, he starts to use him for his own advantage.
 Kara Crane as Jeanette Pachelewski, a quirky girl who harbors a crush on Charlie
 Dexter Darden as Chester, an outcast who becomes popular due to the actions of the "Snowsuit Guys"
 Kellie Cockrell as Jocelyn Lee, a stuck-up popular girl who Derek cheated on Stephanie with
 Molly Jepson as Amy Fox, Virgil's annoying younger sister
 Larry Filion as FBI Agent (uncredited)
 Dwayne Hackett as Store Manager (uncredited)

Production
Disney Channel first released an official press via its press release website DisneyChannelMedianet.com on July 14, 2007 to confirm the production of Minutemen. The lead star, plot, writers, director and executive producers of this movie were revealed in this press. In addition, another 2008 DCOM named Camp Rock, scheduled to begin production in September 2007, was also confirmed in the same press.

Location

Minutemen was filmed at Murray High School. Murray High School was also the set of: Take Down (1978), Read It and Weep (2006), the auditorium scene of High School Musical (2006), and High School Musical: Get in the Picture (2008). Filming also took place at Highland High School located in Sugar House.

Featured music

The first single of the movie, "Run It Back Again" by Corbin Bleu was released January 22, 2008 on Radio Disney Jams, Vol. 10 and its music video premiered on Disney Channel. Another single titled "Like Whoa" from Aly & AJ began airing January 19 around the world, as a music video on Disney Channel. The song could be purchased on album, Insomniatic.

Reception
Minutemen premiered on Disney Channel on January 25, 2008 with 6.48 million views.

References

External links

 

2008 television films
2008 films
2008 comedy films
2000s adventure comedy films
2000s science fiction adventure films
2000s science fiction comedy films
2000s teen comedy films
Adventure television films
American adventure comedy films
American comedy television films
American science fiction adventure films
American science fiction comedy films
American science fiction television films
American teen comedy films
Disney Channel Original Movie films
Films about time travel
Films directed by Lev L. Spiro
Films scored by Nathan Wang
Films set in 2005
Films set in 2008
Films shot in Salt Lake City
2000s American films